National Maritime Union Building may refer to multiple buildings constructed for the National Maritime Union in Manhattan:

 Maritime Hotel
 Lenox Health Greenwich Village